Events in the year 1839 in Brazil.

Incumbents
 Monarch – Pedro II

Events

Births
 30 April - Floriano Peixoto
 21 June - Machado de Assis

Deaths

References

 
1830s in Brazil
Years of the 19th century in Brazil
Brazil
Brazil